The  is a school in Kinshasa devoted to computer science, electronics and accounting.  The school was founded in 1972 by Anatole Musoko Kanumbi.  The school's name is abbreviated to EIECO.  It has played a leading role in the development of high-tech in the Kinshasa-Brazzaville area.

EIECO offers programs in computer science, radio communications, telecommunications, electronics, electrical engineering, and accounting.  It is modeled after similar institutions in Europe. 

Adapted from the French Wikipedia article

Universities in the Democratic Republic of the Congo
Educational institutions established in 1972
Education in Kinshasa